Deborah Roberts is an American contemporary artist living and working in Austin, Texas. Consisting primarily of mixed media collage, Roberts’s work takes on the subject of otherness as understood against the backdrop of existing societal norms of race and beauty. Since graduating with an MFA from Syracuse University in 2014, she has exhibited widely. Her work has been shown at the Brooklyn Museum, Brooklyn, New York; SF MOMA, San Francisco, California; and the Whitney Museum of American Art, New York, New York.

Work 
Roberts’s work challenges the existing notion of a universal beauty, arguing instead for a more inclusive and subjective understanding of visual culture. By combining found and manipulated images with hand drawn and painted details, Roberts leverages the artistic practice of collage to uplift and dimensionalize her subjects, often taking the form of young girls and, more increasingly, Black boys. The boys and girls who populate her work, while invariably bound to the complicated  the problematic narratives defining American, African American and art history, are, at the same time, free and able to forge their own paths and form their own identities.

The show "Deborah Roberts: I’m" traveled to the Contemporary Austin, the Museum of Contemporary Art Denver, Art + Practice in Los Angeles, and the Cummer Museum of Art and Gardens. She has also exhibited at  Spelman College Museum of Fine Art, Atlanta, Georgia; LACMA, Los Angeles, California; Blanton Museum of Art, Austin, Texas; and the Virginia Museum of Fine Arts, Richmond, Virginia, among various other institutions.

Roberts’s work was included in the 2022 exhibition Women Painting Women at the Modern Art Museum of Fort Worth.

Collections 
Roberts's work is in the collections of the Whitney Museum of American Art, New York, New York; The Studio Museum in Harlem, New York, New York;

References 

Living people
20th-century American women artists
21st-century American women artists
Artists from Austin, Texas
University of North Texas alumni
Syracuse University alumni
Collage artists
American contemporary artists
Year of birth missing (living people)